Bee Branch is a stream in Johnson and Pettis counties of the U.S. state of Missouri. It is a tributary of South Fork Blackwater River.

Bee Branch was so named on account of honeybees near its course.

See also
List of rivers of Missouri

References

Rivers of Johnson County, Missouri
Rivers of Pettis County, Missouri
Rivers of Missouri